Alfons Brehm (16 July 1882 – 7 December 1968) was a German field hockey player. He competed in the men's tournament at the 1908 Summer Olympics.

References

External links
 

1882 births
1968 deaths
German male field hockey players
Olympic field hockey players of Germany
Field hockey players at the 1908 Summer Olympics
Field hockey players from Hamburg